Patricia Owens Fordice (born Patricia Owens; November 27, 1934 – July 12, 2007) was the First Lady of Mississippi from 1992 until 1999, the wife of Republican Governor Kirk Fordice. The couple divorced after forty-four years of marriage on December 9, 1999.

Mrs. Fordice was called the "Eternal First Lady" and received numerous awards for her activities both during and after her husband's tenure as governor. The Mississippi State Legislature awarded her a formal recognition during the 1999 regular session. In Washington, D.C., she received the Mrs. Lyndon B. Johnson National Award, and U.S. President George W. Bush presented her with the Presidential Service Award.

She was listed in 2000 in Marquis Who's Who in the World and the following year in the Cambridge Press's 1000 Great Americans. In 2002, she was included in Marquis Who's Who of American Women. She also received the Medal of Honor from the Daughters of the American Revolution. She was knighted as "Dame of Grace" by the Russian Orthodox Order in recognition of humanitarian efforts on behalf of the city of St. Petersburg, Russia.

Following the divorce, her ex-husband remarried in 2000 but divorced again in 2003. Kirk Fordice then became ill with cancer, and his ex-wife was at his side when he died at the age of seventy in 2004.

In November 2005, Pat Fordice resigned as the city of Jackson's interim head of Human and Cultural Services. At the time, she indicated that the full-time position was more demanding than she believed she could handle. She was also a co-host of Woman to Woman, with Juanita Sims Doty, on Mississippi Public Broadcasting. She appeared in a series of commercials for Keep Mississippi Beautiful and the Mississippi Department of Transportation as part of its anti-littering campaign. One commercial showed Mrs. Fordice saying, "I'm Not Your Mama-Pick it up, Mississippi".

Death
Pat Fordice died in 2007, aged 72, of cancer at her home in Madison, Mississippi. She is interred at Parkway Memorial Cemetery in Ridgeland.

References

1934 births
2007 deaths
First Ladies and Gentlemen of Mississippi
Place of birth missing
Mississippi Republicans
People from Jackson, Mississippi
20th-century American politicians
20th-century American women politicians
Deaths from cancer in Mississippi
Burials in Mississippi
21st-century American women